Fontanelas is a small town located in the civil parish of São João das Lampas, municipality of Sintra, Portugal. Fontanelas is situated just next to the seaside town of Azenhas do Mar.

Towns in Portugal